The 1999 BMW Open was a men's tennis tournament played on Clay courts in Munich, Germany that was part of the World Series of the 1999 ATP Tour. It was the eighty-third edition of the tournament and was held from 26 April until 3 May 1999. Unseeded Franco Squillari won the singles title.

Finals

Singles

 Franco Squillari defeated  Andrei Pavel, 6–4, 6–3.
 It was Squillari's only title of the year and the 1st of his career.

Doubles

 Daniel Orsanic /  Mariano Puerta defeated  Massimo Bertolini /  Cristian Brandi, 7–6(7–3), 3–6, 7–6(7–3).
 It was Orsanic's 1st title of the year and the 6th of his career. It was Puerta's 1st title of the year and the 3rd of his career.

References

 
BMW Open
Bavarian International Tennis Championships